Wilderness Falls is located in Waterfalls Canyon, Grand Teton National Park in the U.S. state of Wyoming. The waterfall also receives snowmelt from Ranger Peak to the north and Doane Peak to the southwest.

References 

Waterfalls of Wyoming
Waterfalls of Grand Teton National Park